Fürstenfeld is a town and a district in southeastern Austria. It is situated within the Austrian federal state of Styria, near the border of Hungary.

According to the 2005 census, Fürstenfeld has 5,986 citizens within its communal area, the larger urban area of Fürstenfeld includes approximately 20% more citizens. It was the centre of an eponymous district until the end of 2012, when it was merged with Hartberg to form Hartberg-Fürstenfeld District.

Fürstenfeld was founded around 1170 as a fortress and received its town charter in 1215. Today it is known for its schools, middle-sized industry, and vicinity to several thermal spas (Loipersdorf, Bad Blumau, Stegersbach).

Geography 
Fürstenfeld is located in the lower  valley near the Burgenland border. Elevation of the urban area ranges from 255m to approximately 300 m ü. A. The city`s central part sits on a river terrace two dozen meters above the valley floor.

History 
First human traces in the Fürstenfeld area are attributed to the Neolithic age. There are numerous Urnfield culture archaeological finds and the Romans also found their way into the later Province of Noricum bordering their Pannonia province. From the 6th century on, Slavs diffused into the Pannonic region and were followed by Bavarian settlers in the 8th century.

Twin towns — sister cities 

Fürstenfeld is twinned with:
 Aindling, Germany
 Körmend, Hungary
 Vişeu de Sus, Romania
 Zug, Switzerland

Notable people 

 Anita
 Herbert Depisch
 Wilfried Elmenreich, researcher and university professor
 Hans Fronius
 Sissy Handler
 Richard L. Heschl, born in Welsdorf
 Markus Hirtler (alias Ermi-Oma), cabaret artist
 Max J. Hiti
 Max Keimel
 Karl Mader, painter, graphic artist
 Bert Isatitsch
 Katharina Paldauf (1625-1675) "flower witch" prosecuted during the Great Witch trial of Feldbach
  (1913, Rudersdorf - 2003)
 Helmut Röhrling (known as ""), member of S.T.S.
 Emmerich Schreiner
 Hanna Schulze-Bauer
 Hannes Schulze-Bauer
  (born 1948, Fürstenfeld), member of S.T.S.
 Fritz Vogt
 Gregor von Rezzori, studied in Fürstenfeld

References

External links 
 Official website of Fürstenfeld 

 
Cities and towns in Hartberg-Fürstenfeld District